Friedrich Wilhelm Karl Oskar Freiherr von Wrangel was a Prussian General of the Infantry who was notable for commanding at the Battle of Kolding during the First Schleswig War.

Biography

Origin
He was the son of the later Prussian Lieutenant General  and his wife Karoline Sophie Henriette, née Countess Truchsess von Waldburg (1777-1819).

Military career
Wrangel was educated in the Culm and Berlin cadet houses and entered military service on 13 August 1830, as a second lieutenant in the 1st Foot Guards. He attended the Prussian Staff College in Berlin from 1837 to 1840.

In December 1841, Wrangel had to leave the service because of duelling and after he had healed from the serious wound he received, he was reinstated in March 1843 by the future Kaiser Wilhelm I. In the next year he was assigned to the Trigonometric Department of the General Staff in Berlin. Having become premier lieutenant in 1846, he accompanied his uncle, Lieutenant General Friedrich Graf von Wrangel, when the latter had received the supreme command of the German troops intended for the First Schleswig War. Accordingly he went to the Elbe duchies in April 1848. There he became a captain and was transferred to the General Staff of Schleswig-Holstein, participating in the campaigns of 1848 and 49.

Before that he had acquired the nickname of "Drummer of Kolding", which a newspaper gave him. The incident that gave him the name took place on 29 April 1849, during the Battle of Kolding, which was occupied by the Schleswig-Holsteiners. When they gave way to the advancing Danes, Wrangel brought them to a halt by snatching the drum from a drummer and began playing the double-quick pace.

When Prussia recalled its officers in April 1850, Wrangel became head of the Topographical Department and only returned to frontline service as a lieutenant colonel during the mobilization of 1859. He was now at the head of a Landwehr regiment, which soon became the 61st (8th Pomeranian) Infantry Regiment in Stolp.

In the Austro-Prussian War, he became commander of the 26th Infantry Brigade in Münster and took part in the Campaign of the Main. He fought in the battles at Dermbach, Kissingen, Laufach, Aschaffenburg, Tauberbischofsheim and the Battle of Gerchsheim. For his services at Gerchsheim, he was awarded the Pour le Mérite.

On 10 August 1867, he was appointed commander of the 18th Division in Flensburg and promoted to lieutenant general in the spring of 1868. In the Franco-Prussian War, his division was part of the IX Corps and participated in the battles of Colombey-Nouilly, Mars-la-Tour and Gravelotte. During the Siege of Metz, his troops attacked from 1 September during the Battle of Noiseville in support of the defensive battle of the Prussian I Corps stationed on the east bank of the Moselle. His division distinguished itself particularly in the Second Battle of Orléans in early December. From there Prince Friedrich Karl of Prussia, Commander-in-Chief of the First and Second armies, telegraphed to Versailles:

For this Wrangel was awarded the oak leaves to his Pour le Mérite. As the war progressed, Wrangel's division was involved in the Battle of Le Mans on 11 January 1871.

After peace was concluded, Wrangel remained at the head of his division in Flensburg until June 1872, when he became governor of Posen. On 2 September 1873 he was given the character of a General of Infantry. Wrangel would retire on 12 December 1876. In recognition of his many years of service, Wilhelm I awarded him the Grand Cross of the Order of the Red Eagle with Oak Leaves and Swords on 16 September 1881. He also was a knight of the Johanniter Order.

Family
Wrangel had married Elisabeth Adelheid Ernestine von Strantz (25 September 1813 in Berlin – 27 February 1891 in Sproitz ) on 26 March 1843. From the marriage came the daughter Adda (born 28 July 1844 in Charlottenburg; died 23 January 1913), who married Karl Freiherr von Liliencron († 1901), Herr auf Sproitz, a chamberlain and former Rittmeister, on 29 July 1864 in Berlin. Adda was a prolific writer and a founding member and chairwoman of the Women's League of the German Colonial Society.

Legacy
In 1903, a memorial was unveiled in Flensburg's city park in his memory, consisting of a statue with a pedestal to which a relief depicting Kolding's drummer was attached. In addition, a street in Flensburg is named after him and there is also a street in Kiel named after him.

Honours and awards
 Honorary Citizen of Flensburg, 1872

Orders and decorations
  Kingdom of Prussia:
 Knight of the Order of the Red Eagle, 4th Class with Swords, 1853; 2nd Class with Star and Oak Leaves, 1871; 1st Class with Swords on Ring, 22 March 1873; Grand Cross, 16 September 1881
 Service Award Cross
 Knight of Honour of the Johanniter Order, 1865; Knight of Justice, 1874
 Pour le Mérite (military), 20 September 1866; with Oak Leaves, 5 December 1870
 Iron Cross (1870), 1st Class with 2nd Class on Black Band
    Ernestine duchies: Commander of the Saxe-Ernestine House Order, 2nd Class, February 1859
 : Military Merit Cross, 30 January 1871
 : Military Merit Cross, 2nd Class
 :
 Knight of the Imperial Order of Saint Vladimir, 4th Class
 Knight of the Imperial Order of Saint Anna, 2nd Class with Crown
 : Commander of the Order of the White Falcon, 24 March 1859
   Sweden-Norway: Commander of the Royal Order of the Sword, 1st Class, 21 December 1859

See also
List of the Pour le Mérite (military class) recipients

Notes

References

Bibliography
 Adda von Liliencron: General der Infanterie Freiherr Karl von Wrangel. Ein Lebensbild nach seinen eigenen Aufzeichnungen. Gotha 1903.
 
  

1812 births
1899 deaths
Prussian people of the Austro-Prussian War
German military personnel of the Franco-Prussian War
People from East Prussia
People of the First Schleswig War
Generals of Infantry (Prussia)
Military personnel from Königsberg
Recipients of the Iron Cross (1870), 1st class
Recipients of the Iron Cross (1870), 2nd class
Recipients of the Pour le Mérite (military class)
Recipients of the Military Merit Cross (Mecklenburg-Schwerin)
Recipients of the Order of St. Vladimir, 4th class
Recipients of the Order of St. Anna, 2nd class
Commanders First Class of the Order of the Sword